The following is a list of episodes for the CBC/Showtime television series The Tudors. The series formally began 1 April 2007.  Individual episodes are numbered.

On 20 June 2010, the series aired its 38th and final episode. All four seasons have been released on DVD in Regions 1, 2 and 4.

Series overview

Episode list

Season 1 (2007)
Henry VIII is the young and virile king of England, and seems to have it all. However, he is troubled by religious unrest in his own kingdom, as well as political struggles and changing allegiances with other countries. And weighing most on his mind is his failure thus far to produce a male heir with his Queen, Katherine of Aragon; So far their only child to survived beyond a few days is the young Princess Mary, on whom he dotes. The aunt of the powerful Spanish king and Holy Roman Emperor Charles, Katherine is all that a queen should be, and popular, but the difficult pursuit of a divorce approved by the Pope becomes a seductive option - especially when he encounters the beautiful, bold and intelligent Anne Boleyn.

Season 2 (2008)
The season two premiere of The Tudors attracted 768,000 viewers to the original broadcast, with an additional 254,000 viewing the reaired broadcast the same night.

Season 3 (2009)
The third season of The Tudors premiered on 5 April 2009, and attracted 726,000 viewers in the United States, which was a five percent decrease from the previous season's premiere. The premiere bested HBO's In Treatment season two premiere which drew 657,000 viewers, and marks one of the few times that a Showtime original received more viewers than an HBO original. The season finale aired on 24 May 2009, and the original broadcast attained 366,000 viewers.

Season 4 (2010)
On 10 April 2009, it was announced that Showtime had picked up The Tudors for a fourth and final season, which contained ten episodes and began airing on 11 April 2010.

Maria Doyle Kennedy, Natalie Dormer, and Annabelle Wallis reprise their roles as Catherine of Aragon, Anne Boleyn, and Jane Seymour, respectively, in individual dream sequences in the final episode.

Home media

See also
Assertio Septem Sacramentorum, book by Henry VIII (Season 1, Episode 4)

References

 

Lists of American drama television series episodes
Lists of British drama television series episodes
Lists of Canadian drama television series episodes
Lists of Irish drama television series episodes